Art&Music Recording is an Italian music record label, publishing company and recording studio cofounded by Dr. Shiver and Omar Zenzon in 2009. The headquarters are located in Gallarate, a few kilometers North of Milan.

Studios
The Art&Music Studio is the largest recording studio in Italy. Completed in October 2012, it covers an area of 1000 m2 (10,760 ft2). Art&Music has two Control Rooms, a third one for the pre-production, six recording booths, a chroma key room, two classrooms dedicated to the A&M Academy courses, and the offices. Control Room A is dedicated to recording, mixing and mastering in stereo and is the largest control room in Europe. Control Room B, originally born as a native Dolby surround room, can be used to work both in stereo and in 5.1 for cinema. The project was developed and managed by a team of top professionals headed by Josif Vezzoli from JVC Acoustics.

Control Room A 

Control Room A has 50sqm of surface, a large frontal window screen and lateral windows that allow it to have a full view of every section. Machinery such as console Solid State Logic (SSL) Duality 48 channels, Apple, Avalon, Avid Pro Tools HDX, Dynaudio Acoustics m4+ and Air 20, Korg, Manley, Neumann, Nord, Pioneer, Royer, Steinberg, TC Electronic System 6000, Virus and Yamaha are some of the instruments used to reach top-quality simultaneous multi-tracks recording in 48 channels in six different recording booths. Control Room A, other than being totally wired to direct Full HD videos, it communicates both with Control Room B and Control Room C.

Control Room B 

This Control Room, just like Control Room A, other than being equipped with audio technology, such as Console SSL Duality 24 channels, Apple, Avid Pro Tools HDX, system Dolby Surround 5.1 Dynaudio Air 25, MADI Technology, can also direct all the six different recording booths of the studios. Thanks to the adjacent Multi-Function Chroma Key Room, Control Room B can record dubbing for films, TV spots and Full HD/4K videos designated to top-quality montages.

Label
Art&Music Recording was founded in 2009 as a Dance record label focused on Progressive House, Electro House, House Music, Future House, Deep house, EDM. In 2012 the Russian trio Serebro has joined the Art&Music roster with the production of their hit single Mama Lover. In 2013 Art&Music  released the track “Catch Me” by Doc M.C. (ft Mimi Blix). The track reached the semi-finals of the Eurovision Song Contest in Malmö and was licensed to Sony Music. On 28 September 2015, after the historical version of Frankie Knuckles of 1992, Art&Music Recording has released “You Got The Love” by Dr. Shiver – Candi Staton ft. Doc M.C., the first official and authorized remix featuring the original 1986 vocal by Candi Staton. This track was chosen for the soundtrack of the Aftermovie of TomorrowWorld 2015 . On 22 May 2017 Art&Music Recording released "Kubera" by David Allen, who was featured in the Tomorrowland Belgium 2017 Aftermovie. As of 2022, Art&Music Recording boasts a roster of more than 80 artists.

Artists
Dr. Shiver
Pharrell Williams
Frank Ocean
Fatman Scoop
Daddy's Groove
Shapov
Michael Feiner
Solberjum
David Allen
John Christian
Galoski
Merk & Kremont
Polina
Ola
Candi Staton
Doc M.C.
Christina Skaar
Luke Morse
SWACQ
Chingy
Dre Melz
Magnus Foss
Corx
Mathias D.
Floats
Tindaro & Jimcash
Serebro
Federico Clapis
Jmi Sissoko
Michelle Lily
Simone Cattaneo
Sewit Jacob Villa
Static False
Roberto Mastromauro
Mula Lansky
Mauro Cottini
Luca Monticelli
Kim Covington
Havoc & Lawn
Fred Gun
Edgar Bet
Kristian Vivo
Cat Alex
Bo Valentine
Antony D'Andrea
Pro Bangah
Sammy Juice&Moto
Fine Touch
Tim Gartz
Mimi Blix
Masse Bros
Marco Evans
Luca Dimoon
Eric Tyrell

Partners 
 Pioneer
Steinberg
 Dynaudio
 Solid State Logic
 Apple
 Google
 Miloco Studios
 YouTube
 SoundCloud
 Shazam

References

External links
 
Art&Music Recording on YouTube
Art&Music Recording on SoundCloud
Studio Equipment

Italian record labels
Electronic dance music record labels
Record labels established in 2009